Key West High School (KWHS) is a public high school in Key West, Florida, United States. It is part of the Monroe County School District.

It was originally at the site of the current Key West City Hall and opened in 1906. It served as a last resort shelter during Hurricane Irma in 2017.

Extracurricular activities 
The school has various clubs including NJROTC, GSA (Gay Straight Alliance), Choir (Misty's, VIPS, Concert, and Freshman), Band (Marching, Concert, Jazz), National Honor Society and Beta Club.

Notable alumni

Khalil Greene, former Clemson Tigers baseball third baseman and Major League Baseball shortstop
Vic Albury, former Major League Baseball pitcher 
Carl Taylor, former Major League Baseball catcher
Boog Powell, former Major League Baseball First Baseman
Mekhi Sargent, former Iowa Hawkeyes football running back, National Football League running back

References 

Public high schools in Florida
Buildings and structures in Key West, Florida
Education in Monroe County, Florida
Educational institutions established in 1906
1906 establishments in Florida